The 1992 Bank of the West Classic was a women's tennis tournament played on indoor carpet courts at the Oakland Coliseum Arena in Oakland, California in the United States and was part of the Tier II category of the 1992 WTA Tour. It was the 21st edition of the tournament ran from November 2 through November 8, 1992. First-seeded Monica Seles won the singles title, her second at the event after 1990, and earned $70,000 first-prize money as well as 300 ranking points.

Finals

Singles
 Monica Seles defeated  Martina Navratilova 6–3, 6–4
 It was Monica Seles' 9th singles title of the year and the 29th of her career.

Doubles
 Gigi Fernández /  Natasha Zvereva defeated  Rosalyn Fairbank-Nideffer /  Gretchen Magers 3–6, 6–2, 6–4

References

External links
 Official website
 ITF tournament edition details
 Tournament draws

Bank of the West Classic
Silicon Valley Classic
Virginia Slims of California
Virginia Slims of California
Virginia Slims of California